Richard Lane (born 21 July 1993) is an English professional rugby union player. He plays at wing and fullback for Bristol Bears in Premiership Rugby. In 2019 he was named as the Bedford Blues' "Players' Player" of the year. He has dual-registration with Cornish Pirates.

On 2 July 2015, Lane signed his first professional contract with Jersey Reds in the RFU Championship.

References

External links
Premiership Rugby Profile
European Professional Club Rugby Profile
Bath Profile

1993 births
Living people
Bath Rugby players
English rugby union players
People educated at Millfield
Rugby union players from Bedford
Rugby union wings